Sarg may refer to:

 Charles Sprague Sargent (1841–1927), American botanist (standard abbreviation for his name is "Sarg.")
 SARG — Syrian Arab Republic Government
 Searchable Arguments in the WHERE clause of a SQL database query.
 SARG04, a quantum key distribution protocol

People with the surname
Tony Sarg (1880–1942), German-American puppeteer and illustrator